Joyce Marjorie Sanxter Tompkins (3 November 1897, London – 27 December 1986, London) was a British scholar of English literature, a specialist in Kipling. She was a winner of the Rose Mary Crawshay Prize (1923).

Life
Joyce Marjorie Sanxter Tompkins was born in London in 1897. Her father, Albert James Tompkins, was a classics teacher.

She attended the German Day School and read English at Bedford College, London. She won the George Smith studentship in 1918, allowing her to obtain a master's degree from the University of London. She then worked as a teaching assistant in the English department at Bedford College.

She won the Rose Mary Crawshay Prize for 1923 with her Study of the Work of Mrs Radcliffe. In 1933, she was awarded a D.Litt. and the following year, she started as an assistant lecturer at the Royal Holloway College. In 1948 she was made reader; twice she served as vice-principal of the college. She retired in 1965.

Tompkins was a visiting professor at Dalhousie University, Nova Scotia, between 1967 and 1969, where she promoted its Stewart Collection of Kipling documents among Canadian scholars.

Tompkins' The Polite Marriage  and  Other  Eighteenth  Century  Essays (1938) was a well-received treatise on minor novelists of the late eighteenth century. Her works on Kipling (The Art of Rudyard Kipling, 1959), Elizabeth Barrett Browning (Fawcett Lecture on 'Aurora Leigh', 1961) and William Morris (1987) were lauded for their innovation, keen interpretations, close analysis, and social perspective.

In later life, she suffered from loss of eyesight. She died in 1986.

Selected works

References

Bibliography 
 
 
 
 

1897 births
1986 deaths
Academics of Royal Holloway, University of London
Alumni of Bedford College, London
British academics of English literature
Rose Mary Crawshay Prize winners